Michael Anthony may refer to:

 Michael Anthony (actor), American actor and musician
 Michael Anthony (author) (born 1930), Caribbean author and historian
 Michael Anthony (boxer) (born 1957), boxer from Guyana
 Michael Anthony (musician) (born 1954), former bassist for the rock band Van Halen
 Michael C. Anthony, American stage hypnotist
 Michael A. Anthony (born 1950), member of the South Carolina House of Representatives
 Michael Anthony, a recurring fictional character in the American television series The Millionaire
 Mike Anthony (singer), British lovers rock singer
 Michael Anthony (chef) (born 1968), American chef

See also